Neorossia is a genus of bobtail squid comprising two species.

Species
Genus Neorossia
Neorossia caroli Joubin, 1902, Carol Bobtail
Neorossia leptodons Reid, 1992

References

External links

Bobtail squid
Cephalopod genera